Monts-en-Bessin (literally Monts in Bessin) is a commune in the department of Calvados in the Normandy region in northwestern France.

Population

See also
Communes of the Calvados department

References

Communes of Calvados (department)